Paraguay participated at the 2018 Summer Youth Olympics in Buenos Aires, Argentina from 6 October to 18 October 2018.

Archery

Paraguay qualified one archer based on its performance at the American Continental Qualification Tournament. 

 Boys' individual - Alejandro Benítez
Individual

Team

Athletics

Paraguay qualified one athlete.

 Boys' 100 m - Mateo Vargas

Beach handball

Paraguay qualified a boys' and girls' team based on their overall ranking from the 2017 Youth Beach Handball World Championship.

 Boys' tournament - 1 team
 Girls' tournament - 1 team

Beach volleyball

Paraguay qualified a boys' and girls' team based on their overall ranking from the South American Youth Tour.

 Boys' tournament - Jorge Riveros and Gonzalo Melgarejo.
 Girls' tournament - Giuliana Poletti and Romina Ediger.

Equestrian

Paraguay qualified a rider based on its ranking in the FEI World Jumping Challenge Rankings.

 Individual Jumping - Agostina Llano Zuccolillo

Swimming

Paraguay qualified one athlete.

 Boys' 100 m Freestyle - Matheo Mateos

References

2018 in Paraguayan sport
Nations at the 2018 Summer Youth Olympics
Paraguay at the Youth Olympics